Elikkulam  is a village in Kottayam district in the state of Kerala, India. It is located between the plantation towns of Kanjirapally and Palai, and is the northernmost boundary of Kanjirapally Taluk.

Demographics
 India census, Elikkulam had a population of 10220 with 5131 males and 5089 females. The population chiefly comprises Syrian Christians and Hindus. The place is purely agrarian, with its people engaged in cultivation of cash crops, mainly rubber.

References

Villages in Kottayam district